Şamil Çinaz (born 8 March 1986) is a German former professional footballer who played as a midfielder.

Career
Çinaz moved to Orduspor in 2012. He joined Kayserispor in 2017.

References

External links
 
 

1986 births
Living people
Footballers from Nuremberg
Turkish people of Circassian descent
German people of Turkish descent
Turkish footballers
German footballers
Association football midfielders
2. Bundesliga players
3. Liga players
Süper Lig players
FSV Frankfurt players
1. FC Nürnberg II players
FC Rot-Weiß Erfurt players
Orduspor footballers
Bursaspor footballers
Kayserispor footballers
German expatriate footballers
German expatriate sportspeople in Turkey
Expatriate footballers in Turkey